Rasbora septentrionalis is a species of ray-finned fish in the genus Rasbora which is found in the Mekong Basin in Yunnan and Laos.

References 

Fish of Thailand
Rasboras
Taxa named by Maurice Kottelat
Fish described in 2000